Telly Bronson Tuita (born 1980) is an Australian interdisciplinary artist notable for 2020 Molly Morpeth Canaday award for the work Three Graces - U'ufoasini, Akale'a, Ta'alea creating. Later in 2021 becoming a finalist for the National Contemporary Art Award for work Diasporas Children Wellington. Also notable for the creator of the fictional word 'Tongpop' defined as a combination of Tuita's adoration for dazzling, distinct hues and traditional 'Tongan ngatu patterns and religious iconography.'

Biography 
Telly Tuita was born in 1980 in Tonga. At age nine, he migrated to Sydney, Australia, living in Australia for most of his life, now currently located in Wellington New Zealand. 1999-2003 Tuita studied and completed a Bachelor of Fine Art at Western Sydney University before going to the University of New South Wales to pursue a Bachelor of Art Education in 2004. Later in 2011, he completed a Master's in Special Education with the University of Sydney. Tuita worked at Green Square School primary school and community centre from 2015 to 2017 as a High School art teacher, a Special Education teacher, and an Assistant Principal. 

Telly Tuita delves into his cultural identity through nostalgia, which is shaped by his childhood relocation from Tonga. Tuita developed Tongpop, a distinct visual language, as a result of his exploration of his ethnic identity and complex relationship with his ancestral land.

After the destructive Tonga tsunami in 2022 New Zealand based Tongan artists established an online art project named Peau Kula, to fundraise. Tuita along with other artists sunch as Sione Monū and Dagmar Dyck donated works to this cause. Peau Kula is a  Tongan name that refers to the ferocity and power of a wave as expressed in red, also acknowledging Tongan enriched history with volcanic eruptions and the experience of the Peau kula.

Tuita's Inaugural solo exhibition Tongpop Nostalgia was a pivotal point in his career. Tuita ran a crowd funding campaign to allow the work to be presented in Ōtautahi.  

In 2021-Tuait's work Ofa Atu was part of a Wellington City Council the Creative Hoardings pilot programme. Creative Hoardings have been developed in response to a growing number of construction sites around Wellington. Hoardings consist of plywood panels and simple framing structures and surround construction sites as temporary safety walls.

Selected exhibitions 
2020- Tongpop Nostalgia. CoCA - Centre of Contemporary Art Toi Moroki, Christchurch.  
2020- TongPop Herstory. Weasel Gallery, Hamilton.
2020- Tongpop Fetish. Object Space, Auckland. 
2020-2021- SALTWATER/Interconnectivity. TAUTAI, Auckland. Collaboration with Peter Elavera, Shawnee Tekii, Te Ara Minhinnick, Katharine Losi Atafu-Mayo and Peter Elavera. 
2022 - Whetūrangitia/Made As Stars. Dowse Art Museum. Group exhibition alongside Ashin Ashin, Hannah Claus, Solomon Enos, Glenn Gear, Robert Jahnke, Maioha Kara, Subash Thebe Limbu, Tcheu Siong, Kereama Taepa, Tyrone Te Waa, Jasmine Togo-Brisby and Pati Tyrell.

Awards 
2020- Molly Morpeth Canaday Award (Arts Whakatāne Highly Commended Award.)
2021- Finalists for the 2021 National Contemporary Art Award for work Diasporas Children Wellington.

References

Australian artists
1980 births
Living people